Acoustic Sheep is an American producer of audio headphones headquartered in Erie, Pennsylvania. The company manufactures SleepPhones, a sleep aid headphone, and RunPhones, a breathable headband with built in headphones designed to not fall out like earbuds.

History
Acoustic Sheep was founded by Dr. Wei-Shin Lai and her husband Jason Wolfe in 2007.

In April 2013 Acoustic Sheep successfully funded an Indiegogo campaign raising $7,955 from their goal of $5,000.

By 2014, SleepPhones had been sold in over 50 countries.

In 2015 and again 2016 the SleepPhones were demonstrated at the Consumer Electronics Show. In 2015 the product won a design award at the show, and by the end of the year move than half a million headphone sets had been sold.

In 2016 Wei-Shin was named Pennsylvania Businessperson of the Year by the US Small Business Association.  Also in 2016, the company began selling its products on the Grommet website.

References 

Companies based in Erie, Pennsylvania
Manufacturing companies based in Pennsylvania
American companies established in 2007
2007 establishments in Pennsylvania
Manufacturing companies established in 2007